Pluteus pellitus is a species of fungus belonging to the family Pluteaceae.

It has almost cosmopolitan distribution.

References

Pluteaceae
Taxa named by Christiaan Hendrik Persoon